The 2019 ITF Women's World Tennis Tour is the 2019 edition of the second tier tour for women's professional tennis. It is organised by the International Tennis Federation and is a tier below the WTA Tour. The ITF Women's World Tennis Tour includes tournaments with prize money ranging from $15,000 up to $100,000.

Key

Month

January

February

March

External links 
 International Tennis Federation (ITF)

 1